Adesmia is a genus of beetles in the family Tenebrionidae. This includes the Pitted beetle

References

Pimeliinae